Worsdell is a surname. Notable people with the surname include:

 Nathaniel Worsdell, English locomotive engineer
 Thomas Clarke Worsdell, English locomotive engineer
 Thomas William Worsdell (1838–1916), English locomotive engineer
 Wilson Worsdell, English locomotive engineer